Czarnów  is a village in the administrative district of Gmina Dąbrówka, within Wołomin County, Masovian Voivodeship, in east-central Poland.

The village has an approximate population of 150.

References

Villages in Wołomin County